Dekatriata is a clade of planatergan chelicerates including the groups Arachnida, Chasmataspidida, Eurypterida and additionally two stem-genera Winneshiekia and Houia. Dekatriata is defined by an opisthosoma with 13 segments as groundplan (the number proposed to be secondarily reduced in most arachnid orders) and fused, plate-like appendages on the first opisthosomal segment (somite VII).

References 

 
Middle Ordovician first appearances